Sandy Island is an island in Anguilla, a British Overseas Territory, and is part of the Lesser Antilles in the Caribbean Sea.

Sandy Island is a small island on which a local restaurant is located. From Sandy Ground, Anguilla can be reached in 15 minutes, and the owner of the restaurant takes care of the free boat crossing. The island is small (ca. 250x75 meters), consisting of round white sands with in the middle a little vegetation with shrubs and palm trees.

The island is popular with tourists for the richness of its seabed, the beach of fine sand and coral for the presence of a business (bar / restaurant) famous in the area.

In 1995, the island was submerged by Hurricane Luis for some days while the facilities were severely damaged by the passage of the next several tropical cyclones and, during one of these storms, vessel went aground on the island. The buildings were rebuilt later.

Even the flora was damaged by tropical storms, the palm trees and shrubs were uprooted by strong winds giving the island an aspect even more barren, almost without vegetation.

The restaurant was re-built in 2007, however in 2017, Hurricane Irma destroyed the buildings and vegetation, leaving a bare sand bar.

References

Islands of Anguilla